James Gaines, birth name James Larry M. Gaines Jr., is a character actor, singer, musician, writer, director and producer born on May 18, in Maui, Hawaii. He was sometimes also credited as Jaimes Gaines, Jim Gaines, and James Gainers.

Career
He acted mainly in low-budget action films in the Philippines during the 1980s, many of which were produced by K.Y. Lim's Silver Star Film Company (called Kinavesa in the Philippines), and directed by Teddy Page or John Gale. Next to Mike Monty, with whom he appeared in several films together, Gaines was one of the most prolific actors in Filipino B-movies. He also appeared in some Italian and American productions shot in the archipelago.

Gaines acted in numerous movies with fellow actors based in the philippines Romano Kristoff, Bruce Baron, Mike Cohen, Ken Watanabe, Ann Milhench, Gwendolyn Hung, and Ronnie Patterson. Gaines also appeared in all of the films Richard Harrison made for Silver Star: As Digger the informer in Fireback, as Tom in Hunter's Crossing, as a gangster in Blood Debts (1983), and as Greene, one of the heroic mercenaries led by Harrison in Intrusion Cambodia (1984). The Silver Star films have since become minor cult films in Z-movie fandom.

Arguably the most well-known movies Gaines appeared in were The Last Hunter (starring David Warbeck, Tisa Farrow, Tony King and John Steiner) (1980) for director Antonio Margheriti, Robowar (starring Reb Brown, Catherine Hickland, John P. Dulaney, Max Laurel and Mel Davidson) (1988) for director Bruno Mattei and brief parts in American Ninja (starring Michael Dudikoff and Steve James) (1985) for director Sam Firstenberg and Enter The Ninja (starring Franco Nero, Susan George, Christopher George and Sho Kosugi) (1981) for director Menahem Golan.

Writer, director, Producer
Gaines also co-wrote the script for Black Fire (1985) and wrote War Without End (1987), both directed by Teddy Page, and probably had other writing credits under different pseudonyms. As the Filipino film industry dwindled in the early 1990s, James Gaines slowed down his film work and is now semi-retired as an actor.

Gaines now mostly work behind the camera as director and producer. Gaines co-directed with Teddy Page Phantom Soldiers (1986), Matira ang Matibay with Page and Phillip Kho, directed Joe Reyes (starring Roi Vinzon) in 1996. His first directorial debut Secrets of King Maji's Treasure (starring Gary Daniels), a film shot in the mid-1980s, and had other directing credits under different pseudonyms. His latest work as writer and director is Mundo which he also co-produced (2007), Associate Director for The Lease (2018), Directed Bataan Risers MTV, I Love You Po MTV, Copy writer and Director, Philippines in 60 seconds Ad campaign (2018),  Maya The Sacrifice trailer teaser (Producer & Director 2019),

Recent appearances
His most recent film appearances were in 2007, in Zombi: La Creazione directed by Bruno Mattei, and Vengeance of Cleopatra Wong, directed by Bobby A. Suarez, The Refrigerator (pridyider) (2012), Orange, in 2015, Fright Gallery web Series in 2016 and Tedd (inanimate soul) in 2017. Gaines was also interviewed in the 2007 documentary The Search for Weng Weng. Gaines is also mentioned briefly by Richard Harrison, Sebastian Harrison and John P. Dulaney in the books Gods in Polyester, Or, A Survivors' Account of 70's Cinema Obscura (2004/Succubus Press) and Gods in Spandex, Or, A Survivors' Account of 80's Cinema Obscura (2004/Succubus Press).

External links

American male film actors
African-American male actors
American male actors of Filipino descent
American expatriates in the Philippines
Male actors from Hawaii
1955 births
Living people
21st-century African-American people
20th-century African-American people